Marina Babkova (born 24 November 1969) is a Soviet diver. She competed in the women's 3 metre springboard event at the 1988 Summer Olympics.

References

External links
 
Profile at Infosport.ru 

1969 births
Living people
Soviet female divers
Olympic divers of the Soviet Union
Divers at the 1988 Summer Olympics
Divers from Moscow